Perseo (F 566) is the third ship of the Lupo-class frigate of the Italian Navy. She was sold to Peruvian Navy in the 2000s.

Coronel Bolognesi (FM-57) is one of eight Carvajal-class frigates of the Peruvian Navy.

Construction and career

Italian service

The ship initially built for the Italian Navy and was named Perseo with a pennant of F 566. The ship was laid down on 28 February 1977, was launched on 12 July 1978 by the shipyard Riva Trigoso and commissioned in the Italian Navy on 1 March 1980.

At the beginning of the 1980s the ship took part, in September 1982, in the ITALCON mission for peace operations in Lebanon, as part of the UN mission UNIFIL. At the end of the decade the ship was then engaged in the Persian Gulf, during the Iran-Iraq conflict. Sailing in hostile waters are very dangerous and the Italian motor ship Jolly Rubino, attacked by the Iranian, this prompted the Navy to send a contingent to the area, made up of frigates, logistic units and minesweepers engaged in escort operations on the ship merchant and landmine clearance.

In 2003, Perseo was decommissioned and transferred to the Navy of Peru.

Peruvian service

She was commissioned on 31 October 2005. For its commissioning process, Coronel Bolognesi sailed from the port of La Spezia in the Mediterranean Sea, across the Atlantic Ocean and into the Pacific Ocean via the Panama Canal, and south to its base in Callao.

References

External links
 Perseo (F 566) Marina Militare website

Carvajal-class frigates
1978 ships
Ships built by Fincantieri
Ships built in Italy
Frigates of the Cold War